NGC 6603 is an open cluster discovered by John Herschel on July 15, 1830 located in Sagittarius constellation.

Situated within the brightest part of star cloud Messier 24, it is classified by Shapley as type "g". This cluster consists of about 30 stars in a field of about 5 arc minutes in diameter, and is about 9400 light years remote. Thus its linear diameter should be about 14 light years. The hottest stars are about B9 (pointing to an intermediate age of several 100 million years, an estimate of which is not known to the present author), and the brightest of photographic mag 14.

Many sources improperly identify NGC 6603 as Messier 24.

References

External links
 
 

6603
Open clusters
Astronomical objects discovered in 1830
Sagittarius (constellation)